Atypical lichen myxedematosus  is a skin condition caused by fibroblasts producing abnormally large amounts of mucopolysaccharides.

See also 
 Lichen myxedematosus
 Skin lesion

References

External links 

Mucinoses